Aida Osman (born 1997) is an American writer, stand-up comedian, and actor. She is a former co-host of the podcast, Keep It. She has written for Big Mouth; Betty; and the HBO Max series Rap Sh!t, on which she also co-stars.

Early life and education 
Osman grew up in Lincoln, Nebraska, to Eritrean refugee parents. She was raised Muslim. The city is predominantly white, and she and her older brother were the only Black children at her school. She aspired to a career related to entertainment from youth. Osman trained in dance, played in the orchestra growing up, and was active in theatre in high school. She graduated from Northeast High School.

She attended the University of Nebraska–Lincoln and graduated with a bachelor's degree in philosophy in 2018. She was accepted into law school, but deferred her admission to pursue comedy. She began performing stand-up comedy in Nebraska and eventually moved to New York City.

Career 
Osman's first television appearance was Wild 'n Out on MTV. She next wrote for Complex and then  starred in the Complex Networks web series Group Therapy. Osman then relocated to Los Angeles to co-host the pop culture podcast Keep It for Crooked Media.

She has written for the Netflix show Big Mouth and the HBO series Betty. In 2022, Osman made their debut lead television role as a co-star and staff writer for Rap Sh!t on HBO Max.

Personal life 
Osman resides in Los Angeles. She is non-binary and queer. She uses she and they pronouns.

In 2020, Osman started a GoFundMe for David McAtee that raised over $200,000 in its first day.

References

External links 
 Official Instagram
 

Living people
American stand-up comedians
American non-binary actors
Non-binary writers
Writers from Lincoln, Nebraska
American Muslims
University of Nebraska–Lincoln alumni
LGBT African Americans
Queer writers
LGBT people from Nebraska
American people of Eritrean descent
1997 births